Julia Elena Fortún Melgarejo (9 October 1929 – 5 December 2016) was a Bolivian historian, anthropologist, folklorist, and ethnomusicologist, pioneer in this last field in her country. She was born in the city of Sucre but lived in La Paz for most of her life.

She obtained an anthropology degree in Buenos Aires, Argentina, and her doctorate in history in the Universidad Central de Madrid in Spain. Back in Bolivia, Fortún studied music in the Academia Eduardo Berdecio and subsequently in the Conservatorio Nacional de Música in the city of La Paz. She died on 5 December 2016 at the age of 87.

Works
Among the books written by Julia Elena Fortún are:

 Música indígena de Bolivia (1947)
 Nuestra música folklórica (1948)
 Manual para la recolección de material folklórico (1957)
 La danza de los diablos (1960)
 La mujer aymara (1964)

References

1929 births
2016 deaths
20th-century Bolivian historians
Ethnomusicologists
Bolivian women anthropologists
People from Sucre
Women historians
Women ethnomusicologists